Baz's Culture Clash is a six-part television series. The presenter, Bazil Ashmawy, of half Egyptian parentage, spoke of this as his next television project on The Podge and Rodge Show on 21 October 2008 as he was filming the series. It is his first solo television show, having previously starred in How Low Can You Go? with Michael Hayes and Mark O'Neill. He had begun filming in September 2008 and finished the following April. He travelled the world to film the show. It was aired on RTÉ Television during September and October 2009. It was initially expected to be aired in March 2009. Paili Meek produced and Barry Egan directed. The series commenced broadcasting on 14 September 2009. A second series is on the way.

Ashmawy visits a coven of witches in Kells, County Meath during one episode and undergoes hypnosis there to allow him to meet his Egyptian ancestors. He also visits a haunted house with a group called "Leinster Paranormal". He also teams up with a group of ghostbusters to visit the haunted Carlow Shopping Centre where a little girl and some former prisoners from the old county gaol are among the ghosts which are said to haunt the building. The episode in the shopping centre was filmed at night and in one incident a member of Ashmawy's film crew collapses without explanation when his body is invaded. In another episode Ashmawy meets a man who diets on roadkill, including badgers and cats.

Reception
The series was poorly received by the Irish media.

Irish Independent critic John Boland said the first episode "gives a new meaning to the notion of meaninglessness", questioning the purpose of a show where Ashmawy "grinned and grimaced his way through southern California in an unserious search of alternative therapies". Hilary Fannin of The Irish Times said a later episode "investigated (well, that might be too strong a word for it – let’s say glossed over) the world of the paranormal". Paul Whitington in the Irish Independent described the topics covered in the series as "new-age nonsense".

References

External links
 Website

2009 Irish television series debuts
Irish television shows
RTÉ original programming
2009 Irish television series endings